Spencer Gavin Duval (born 5 January 1970) is a male retired British middle-distance runner. Duval competed in the men's 3000 metres steeplechase at the 1996 Summer Olympics. He represented England in the 3000 metres steeplechase event, at the 1994 Commonwealth Games in Victoria, British Columbia, Canada. Four years later he represented England in the 3000 metres steeplechase event again, at the 1998 Commonwealth Games in Kuala Lumpur, Malaysia.

References

External links
 

1970 births
Living people
Athletes (track and field) at the 1996 Summer Olympics
British male middle-distance runners
British male steeplechase runners
Olympic athletes of Great Britain
Athletes (track and field) at the 1994 Commonwealth Games
Athletes (track and field) at the 1998 Commonwealth Games
Commonwealth Games competitors for England